Yinzer is a 20th-century term playing on the Pittsburghese second-person plural vernacular "yinz."  The word is used among people who identify themselves with the city of Pittsburgh and its traditions.

History

"Yinzer"  (or "Yunzer") was historically used to identify the typical blue-collar people from the Pittsburgh region who often spoke with a heavy Pittsburghese accent. The term stems from the word yinz (or yunz), a second-person plural pronoun brought to the area by early Scottish-Irish immigrants. Over time, yinzer has been used by many Pittsburgh residents to self-identify, even if they don't speak with a thick accent.

The concept and use of the word gained popularity in the 21st century as the area's population loss slowed, and the city became a hub for revitalization. As the city gained note as a desirable place to live, more outsiders have moved or returned to the Pittsburgh metropolitan area. The term has taken on a connotation to identify someone who, for better or worse, is either a lifelong Pittsburgher, or says a phrase or commits an act that could be identified as something a stereotypical Pittsburgher might do.

References

American regional nicknames
Culture of Pittsburgh
Demographic history of the United States
Working-class culture in Pennsylvania
Yinz